Limnenetes is an extinct genus of oreodont, endemic to North America. Fossils have been uncovered in Montana and Texas.

Limnenetes was a herbivore with a heavy body, long tail, short feet, and four-toed hooves.

Resources

 
Eocene even-toed ungulates
Oligocene even-toed ungulates
Rupelian genus extinctions
Prehistoric mammals of North America
Prehistoric even-toed ungulate genera